Megalographa agualaniata is a moth of the family Noctuidae. It is found in the montane areas of South America, from Venezuela and Colombia southward to Bolivia and Peru.

External links
 A review of the genus Megalographa Lafontaine and Poole (Lepidoptera: Noctuidae: Plusiinae) with the description of a new species from Costa Rica

Plusiinae
Moths described in 1912